Ying Zhu is Professor Emeritus at the City University of New York and Director of the Center for Film and Moving Image Research in the Academy of Film, Hong Kong Baptist University.  Zhu is the Founder and Chief Editor of Global Storytelling: Journal of Digital and Moving Images

Career
A leading scholar in film and media, Ying Zhu’s research areas encompass Chinese cinema and media, Sino-Hollywood relations, and TV dramas. Zhu has published ten books, including Hollywood in China: Behind the Scenes of the World's Largest Movie Market (2022), Soft Power with Chinese Characteristics: China's Campaign for Hearts and Minds (Coedited with Stanley Rosen and Kingsley Edney),
Two Billion Eyes: The Story of China Central Television (2014) and Art, Politics, and Commerce in Chinese Cinema (2010).

Her first research monograph, Chinese Cinema During the Era of Reform: The Ingenuity of the System (2003) pioneered the study on history of Chinese film studios.
Her second research monograph, Television in Post-Reform China: Serial Drama, Confucian Leadership and the Global Television Market (2008),
together with two edited books in which her work featured—TV China (2009) and TV Drama in China (2008)—pioneered the subfield of Chinese TV drama studies in the West. Her latest research monograph, Hollywood in China: Behind the Scenes of the World's Largest Movie Market explores how movies have become one of the biggest areas of competition between the world’s two remaining superpowers.

Zhu reviews manuscripts for major publications and evaluates grant proposals for research foundations in Australia, Canada, Hong Kong, Sweden, the U.K., and the U.S.
Zhu also produces current affairs documentary films, including Google vs. China (2011) and China: From Cartier to Confucius (2012), both screened on the Netherlands Public Television.

Zhu is founder and editor in chief of Global Storytelling an international and interdisciplinary forum for intellectual debates concerning the politics, economics, culture, media, and technology of the moving image.

Awards
Zhu received a 2006 National Endowment for the Humanities Fellowship, a 2008 American Council of Learned Societies Fellowship, and a 2017 Fulbright Senior Research Fellowship.

See also
Cinema of China
Television in the People's Republic of China

References

American mass media scholars